Al Qaisumah/Hafr al Batin Airport is an airport serving Al Qaisumah (also spelled Al Qaysumah), a village near the city of Hafar al-Batin in Eastern Province, Saudi Arabia.

The airport began in 1962 as a dusty runway for a Dakota aircraft which was used at that time for transporting Saudi Aramco employees between stations in the northern region. Today, the airport has a 3000 metres runway capable of handling Boeing 737, a total of 11 million square metre area, a passenger terminal, a sewage system and a water treatment and stand-by power plant.

Facilities

Airlines and destinations

Airlines offering scheduled passenger service:

See also
 Abha International Airport
 List of Airports in Saudi Arabia

References

External links

 General Authority of Civil Aviation (GACA) 
 
 
 

1962 establishments in Saudi Arabia
Airports established in 1962
Airports in Saudi Arabia
Qaisumah